Agriphila attenuata is a moth in the family Crambidae. It was described by Augustus Radcliffe Grote in 1880. It is found in North America, where it has been recorded from coastal California, Washington, Wyoming, British Columbia and Alberta. The habitat consists of grasslands.

The wingspan is 24–26 mm. The forewings are pale cinereous (ash grey) with fuscous areas and a scattered dark scales. The hindwings are pale fuscous. Adults are on wing from late August to early September.

The larvae probably feed on grasses.

References

Crambini
Moths described in 1880
Moths of North America